Mickey Horton is a fictional character from the soap opera Days of Our Lives, played from the show's debut episode in 1965 until January 2004 by John Clarke, spanning 3,500 episodes. The role was briefly played in 2004 by Richard Voigts, then by John Ingle from 2004 through 2006. Kevin Dobson appeared as Mickey in the character's final appearances between April and October 2008.

At the time of his retirement, Clarke was the longest-tenured original Days of our Lives actor after his onscreen mother Frances Reid (Alice Horton), appearing in the role for 39 years. He was nominated for a Daytime Emmy Award in 1979 for Lead Actor in a Drama Series for his portrayal of Mickey.

Storylines
Mickey was the middle son of Tom and Alice Horton and had four siblings: Tommy, Addie, Marie and, possibly his biggest rival, Bill. In the first episode in 1965, Mickey was introduced as a lawyer in Salem. His father Tom found out that Addie's daughter Julie and a friend stole mink from a department store. Wary that there might be legal repercussions, Tom and Mickey went to the police station to talk to the chief of police and Julie.

In 1965, Mickey started a relationship with Diane Hunter, whose divorce case Mickey was handling, and helped her to deal with her teenage daughter Susan. Diane and her husband later reconciled, mainly because of Susan. After many long nights working together, Mickey had his sights set on court psychiatrist Laura Spencer.
 She was initially engaged to Mickey's brother Bill, but she and Mickey got together after Bill called off the wedding and left town. After the David Martin murder case, they grew closer and became engaged. They married the following year.

Mickey took a sterility test, revealing that he was unable to have children; he forgot to review the results in the face of Laura announcing her pregnancy. He was unaware that his brother Bill was the father and that he had raped Laura in a drunken rage. Tom saw Mickey's test results and confronted Laura, who lied and said she and Bill consensually had sex. They agreed to keep the secret to protect the family. Michael William Horton was born in November 1968, with Mickey still believing he was the biological father.

In 1970, Mickey had an affair with his secretary Linda Patterson. After he refused to leave Laura for her, Linda attempted suicide; news of the affair spread quickly in Salem. Mickey and Laura decided to stay together for the sake of their son. Linda learned she was pregnant with what she thought was Mickey's baby, but was later revealed to be an ex-boyfriend's. Mike learned about Mickey's affair in 1973 and confronted his father, who suffered a heart attack.

Mickey's brother Bill, a surgeon, performed a life-saving operation. Not long after, Mickey suffered a stroke and developed amnesia. He left Salem and adopted the name Marty Hanson. Maggie Simmons, a paralyzed farm girl, took him in and they fell in love, marrying in January 1974. Later, after Mickey's picture appeared in the paper, he was reunited with his family despite Maggie's best efforts. Bill offered to operate on Mickey in an attempt to restore his memory, but Mickey refused. Bill later performed a surgery to help Maggie walk again but it did not work. Laura had started a relationship with Bill after Mickey's disappearance; she and Mickey decided to divorce. Mickey and Maggie remarried in October 1974 after they realized their first marriage was invalid due to Mickey's marriage to Laura.

In 1976, Mike had an accident on Maggie's farm that required a blood donation. Neither of his parents were a match, leading Mickey to the conclusion that he was not Mike's biological father. This was confirmed when he found that his brother was a match. Mickey's memory returned. He went to Linda to ask if Melissa was his and she said no. In a fit of rage at being lied to for years, Mickey bought a gun and plotted to kill his brother. The two fought over the gun and it went off, shooting Bill in the arm. Mickey suffered a mental breakdown in the aftermath and was sent to the Bayview Sanitarium for a year.

Following his release from Bayview, Mickey and Maggie adopted their foster daughter Janice. Janice was kidnapped by her biological mother Joanna in 1978 but was found and returned to the Horton household. Maggie began drinking and she and Mickey lost custody of Janice to Joanna the following year. In 1981, Maggie agreed to be a surrogate mother for an anonymous donor and was inseminated by Dr. Neil Curtis. She tested pregnant shortly after. Mickey discovered that the anonymous donor was Evan Whyland but Maggie wanted to keep the baby regardless. Sarah Horton was born later that year; Mickey and Maggie were awarded custody over Evan. They also wound up with custody of Melissa after Linda failed to appear in court.

Mickey was kidnapped by Stefano DiMera after Mickey discovered that Stefano was blackmailing Evan and that Stefano caused Maggie's car accident. In 1983, Mickey escaped the DiMera island and arrived back in Salem to find that Maggie, believing Mickey was dead, was in a relationship with attorney Don Craig. The revelation gave Mickey a second heart attack, from which he eventually recovered. Mickey and Maggie divorced but Maggie quickly realized she was still in love with Mickey. She left Salem for New York for a year and returned in 1985, having missed Linda's plot to steal Anderson Manufacturing stock from Melissa under the guise of repairing their relationship. Mickey was shot and convalesced at Maggie's house. They remarried in 1986.

In 1988, Mickey ran for Senate. His rival was Jack Deveraux, who was dating Melissa. Jack proposed but Melissa learned he was using her and broke up with him. Meanwhile, Maggie and Mickey's relationship had become strained due to the long hours Mickey worked. Maggie had an affair with Neil Curtis, the doctor who inseminated her. Sarah caught them having sex and threatened to tell Mickey; Maggie and Neil then revealed that Neil was Sarah's biological father, not Evan. Despite this, Sarah still told Mickey, who blamed himself for the affair. Mickey and Maggie eventually repaired their relationship and Neil left town.

In 2003, the Salem Stalker broke into the Horton home. Mickey was stabbed with a scalpel and Maggie was killed with a blow to the head from a wine bottle. After months of grieving, Mickey married Bonnie Lockhart. It was soon revealed that Maggie was still alive and had been kidnapped by the DiMera family and stranded on their island with other Salem Stalker victims. Upon her return, Mickey spent months unsure of whether he would stay with Maggie, whose "death" had nullified their marriage, or Bonnie, his current wife. He eventually decided to return to Maggie.

During the mid-2000s, Mickey was in Chicago covering several trials and was rarely seen in Salem. He appeared in the 2008 and 2009 Christmas episodes, watching movies and sitting in the kitchen with his mother. Before New Year's Eve in 2009, he called to tell Maggie he was unable to make it home to Salem; the two decided to spend more time together in 2010. They agreed to go on a cruise in January on Julie's recommendation.

Death
Mickey died from a heart attack while packing to go on a cruise with Maggie on January 8, 2010. Maggie found Mickey's body and came downstairs in shock after attempting CPR. Hope arrived at the house while Maggie was still in shock; she went upstairs to check on Mickey and called 911. The paramedics removed Mickey's body from the house. A week later, the family held a memorial service, where Mickey and Maggie were both celebrated. Melissa attended the service to comfort Maggie. In June, Mickey's mother died of natural causes. Maggie and Julie celebrated Alice's relationship with her son, Mickey.

Mickey's cases
Mickey was usually seen whenever a Salem character had legal problems and needed an attorney. Despite this, he had a reputation for never winning a case; many of his clients ended up in prison for crimes they didn't commit.

Mickey represented the defendant unless otherwise stated in the table below; his role in the cases are listed. He spent a few years as assistant district attorney in the late 1980s.

Reception

Notes

References

Horton, Mickey
Television characters introduced in 1965
Fictional lawyers
Male characters in television
Horton family